Brachystele is a genus of flowering plants from the orchid family, Orchidaceae. It consists of 20 species native primarily to South America but with a few species in Mexico, Central America, and Trinidad & Tobago.

Brachystele arechavaletae (Kraenzl.) Schltr.
Brachystele bicrinita Szlach.
Brachystele bracteosa (Lindl.) Schltr.
Brachystele burkartii M.N.Correa
Brachystele camporum (Lindl.) Schltr.
Brachystele chlorops (Rchb.f.) Schltr.
Brachystele cyclochila (Kraenzl.) Schltr.
Brachystele delicatula (Kraenzl.) Schltr.
Brachystele dilatata (Lindl.) Schltr.
Brachystele guayanensis (Lindl.) Schltr.
Brachystele luzmariana Szlach. & R.González
Brachystele maasii Szlach.
Brachystele oxyanthos Szlach
Brachystele pappulosa Szlach
Brachystele scabrilingua Szlach
Brachystele subfiliformis (Cogn.) Schltr
Brachystele tamayoana Szlach.
Brachystele unilateralis (Poir.) Schltr
Brachystele waldemarii Szlach.
Brachystele widgrenii (Rchb.f.) Schltr.

See also 
 List of Orchidaceae genera

References 

 Pridgeon, A.M., Cribb, P.J., Chase, M.A. & Rasmussen, F. eds. (1999). Genera Orchidacearum 1. Oxford Univ. Press.
 Pridgeon, A.M., Cribb, P.J., Chase, M.A. & Rasmussen, F. eds. (2001). Genera Orchidacearum 2. Oxford Univ. Press.
 Pridgeon, A.M., Cribb, P.J., Chase, M.A. & Rasmussen, F. eds. (2003). Genera Orchidacearum 3. Oxford Univ. Press
 Berg Pana, H. 2005. Handbuch der Orchideen-Namen. Dictionary of Orchid Names. Dizionario dei nomi delle orchidee. Ulmer, Stuttgart

External links 
 
 

Cranichideae genera
Orchids of Mexico
Orchids of Central America
Orchids of South America
Flora of Trinidad and Tobago
Spiranthinae